Sir David Roderick Kirch, KBE (born 1936) is a British businessman, collector, and philanthropist.

Background
Kirch has lived in Jersey since 1973.

Collecting
Over his lifetime Kirch built up and subsequently sold what was probably the world's largest collection of Zeppelin memorabilia, and a collection of provincial bank notes said to be "the most extensive selection of iconic and historical notes of this series ever assembled" by Barnaby Faull, Head of Spink's Banknotes department.

In recent years, he has been selling off items from his various collections and donating the funds to his charitable trust.

Philanthropy

In 2006, Kirch celebrated his 70th birthday by announcing his plans to give everyone in Jersey, aged 70 or over, £100 in vouchers to spend in the island's Co-op supermarkets. He has continued to give away around £1m, along the same lines, each year since 2006.

In 2012, Kirch announced his plans to leave his fortune, of approximately £100m, to the David Kirch Charitable Trust.

In 2013, he appeared at the top of The Sunday Times Giving List, and was appointed Knight Commander of the Order of the British Empire (KBE) in the 2013 Birthday Honours for "services as a philanthropist to senior citizens of Jersey".

References

British philanthropists
British businesspeople
British collectors
Living people
Jersey people
1936 births
Knights Commander of the Order of the British Empire